The 1897 State of the Union Address was written on Monday, December 6, 1897, by President William McKinley, the 25th president of the United States.  It was his first State of the Union Address, and was read to both houses of the 55th United States Congress.  He began with, "A matter of genuine satisfaction is the growing feeling of fraternal regard and unification of all sections of our country, the incompleteness of which has too long delayed realization of the highest blessings of the Union. The spirit of patriotism is universal and is ever increasing in fervor."  It took time for the Southern states to feel united with the Northern states, and for the Western states to feel united with the eastern states.

References

State of the Union addresses
Presidency of William McKinley
55th United States Congress
State of the Union Address
State of the Union Address
State of the Union Address
State of the Union Address
December 1897 events
State of the Union